"4Ever" is a song by American rapper Lil' Mo. It was written by Lil' Mo along with Bryan-Michael Cox, Craig Love, and Fabolous for her second album, Meet the Girl Next Door (2003), while production was helmed by Cox and Love. Prior to its official physical release, the song was serviced to radio stations through airplay in early December 2002. Upon its release, critics referred to the single as an "uptempo wedding" ode. In the United States, it reached number 37 on the US Billboard Hot 100.

Music video
On January 19, 2003, a two-day filming shoot began for the music video of "4Ever", which was directed by Benny Boom in Brooklyn, New York. The video initially premiered on BET in late February 2003.

The synopsis of the video focuses on Lil' Mo's reminiscent memories of her boyfriend as she climbs the stairs of an apartment. Each step she takes, Mo receives a flashback, one of which of course features Fabolous.

Track listings and formats
CD single
 "4 Ever" (Album Version) (featuring Fabolous) — 4:34 
 "4 Ever" (Album Version w/ No Intro) (featuring Fabolous) — 3:55  
 "4 Ever" (No Rap Version w/ Intro) — 4:34   
 "4 Ever" (No Rap Version w/ No Intro) — 3:55   
 "4 Ever" (Instrumental) — 4:34   
 "4 Ever" (TV Track) (featuring Fabolous) — 4:34   
 "4 Ever" (A Cappella) (featuring Fabolous) — 4:30

12" vinyl
 "4 Ever" (Album Version)        
 "4 Ever" (Album Version) (No Intro)        
 "4 Ever" (No Rap Version w/ Intro)        
 "4 Ever" (No Rap Version) (No Intro)        
 "Ten Commandments" (Amended Version) (featuring Lil' Kim)    
 "Ten Commandments" (Instrumental)        
 "4 Ever" (Instrumental)        
 "4 Ever" (Acappella)

Remix vinyl
 "4Ever" (Midi Mafia Remix) (featuring Baby Cham)
 "4Ever" (Midi Mafia Remix) (Instrumental)        
 "4Ever" (Midi Mafia Remix) (Acappella) (featuring Baby Cham)
 "21 Answers" (featuring Free)

Charts

Weekly charts

Year-end charts

References

2002 songs
2003 singles
2003 songs
Lil' Mo songs
Fabolous songs
Music videos directed by Benny Boom
Songs written by Bryan-Michael Cox
Songs written by Craig Love
Songs written by Lil' Mo
Songs written by Fabolous
Song recordings produced by Bryan-Michael Cox